Lobophytum spicodigitum is a species of soft coral in the genus Lobophytum.

References 

Alcyoniidae
Animals described in 1984